Mozambican may refer to:
 Something of, from, or related to Mozambique, a country in southeastern Africa
 A person from Mozambique, or of Mozambican descent:
 Demographics of Mozambique
 Culture of Mozambique
 List of Mozambicans
 Mozambican Portuguese, the varieties of Portuguese spoken in Mozambique
 Languages of Mozambique
 Mozambican cuisine

See also 
 

Language and nationality disambiguation pages